Hometown Baghdad is a documentary web series that tells the stories of three Iraqi college students struggling to survive in Baghdad. It was produced by New York-based media company Chat The Planet. The series won three Webby Awards for the categories of Public Service and Activism, Best Reality and News, and Politics in 2008, and was nominated for four Webby Awards in 2009.

References 

2007 web series debuts
Documentary web series